The Craft may refer to:

 The Craft (album), Blackalicious album released in September 2005
 The Craft (film), a 1996 film
 The Craft: Legacy, a 2020 standalone sequel to the 1996 film
 The Craft, an alternative and casual name for Freemasonry
 The Craft, an alternate name for witchcraft
 The Craft, an alternate name for Wicca

See also
 Craft (disambiguation)